Lina Länsberg (born 13 March 1982) is a retired Swedish professional mixed martial artist who competed in the Bantamweight division. She is most notable for her time in the Ultimate Fighting Championship (UFC).

Muay Thai career
Länsberg started training in Muay Thai in 2003, at the age of 21. During her decorated Muay Thai career she fought on the biggest stage, winning the gold medal at the IFMA World Championship two times, 2008 and 2012. She won the silver medal two times, 2010 and 2011, and bronze once, 2007. She also won the gold medal at the  IFMA-EMF European Muay Thai Championships in 2013, and the bronze medal in 2012.

In addition to the international success, she won the Swedish Muay Thai Championship three times, in 2007, 2012 and 2013 as well as winning the Nordic Championship in 2010. She also won the WMC Scandinavian Professional Muay Thai title in 2012. Her Muay Thai record stands at 37-11, including fights against top names such as Valentina Shevchenko.

Mixed martial arts career
In her professional MMA debut, Länsberg fought fellow Swedish rising star Pannie Kianzad on December 29, 2012, at Trophy MMA 1.

She would then go on to win her next 6 fights (4 by TKO, 2 by decision) as she competed in Cage Warriors and other European promotions. This included her defeating Alexandra Buch by TKO in the first round on May 16, 2015, at Superior Challenge 12, to win the promotional Women's Bantamweight title. Another big victory came by unanimous decision against Lucie Pudilová on November 28, 2015, at Battle of Botnia 2015.

Ultimate Fighting Championship
Länsberg made her UFC debut, as a big underdog, in the main event against Cris Cyborg on September 24, 2016, at UFC Fight Night 95. She lost the fight by TKO in the second round.

Länsberg was first expected to face Veronica Macedo on March 18, 2017, at UFC Fight Night 107. However, Macedo later had to pull out due to injury. Länsberg instead had a rematch with Lucie Pudilová at the same event. It was a back-and-forth fight, with Länsberg appearing to be in control over the first two rounds and Pudilová rallying for a comeback in the third, in the end Länsberg won by unanimous decision. Afterwards, she expressed disappointment with her performance, saying she believed that Pudilová maybe should have been awarded the victory. Despite this, a majority of the media score cards still agreed with the judges and had Länsberg as the winner.

Länsberg was expected to face Leslie Smith on July 16, 2017, at UFC Fight Night 113. However, she later had to withdraw from the fight due to an injury and was replaced by Amanda Lemos.

Länsberg faced Aspen Ladd on October 21, 2017, at UFC Fight Night 118. She lost the fight via TKO in round two.

Länsberg faced Gina Mazany on May 27, 2018, at UFC Fight Night 130. She won the fight via unanimous decision.

Next she faced former Invicta FC Bantamweight Champion Yana Kunitskaya on October 6, 2018, at UFC 229. She lost the fight via unanimous decision 

Länsberg faced former long time Invicta FC Bantamweight Champion Tonya Evinger on June 1, 2019, at UFC Fight Night 153. Despite entering the contest as a big underdog, she won the fight via unanimous decision.

In her next fight, Länsberg faced Macy Chiasson on September 28, 2019, at UFC Fight Night 160. She won the fight by unanimous decision.

Länsberg faced Sara McMann on January 25, 2020, at UFC Fight Night 166. She lost the fight via unanimous decision.

After two years away from competing due to giving birth, Länsberg faced Pannie Kianzad on April 16, 2022 at UFC on ESPN 34. Länsberg lost the fight via unanimous decision.

Länsberg faced Karol Rosa at UFC 280 in Abu Dhabi on October 22, 2022. She lost the bout via majority decision.

Länsberg faced Mayra Bueno Silva on February 18, 2023, at UFC Fight Night 219.  She lost the fight via a kneebar submission in round two.

After the bout, Länsberg retired from MMA.

Personal life
Länsberg and UFC veteran Akira Corassani have a daughter (born 2021).

Championships and accomplishments

Mixed martial arts
Superior Challenge
SC Women's Bantamweight Championship (one time; first)
Nordic MMA Awards
2019 Female Fighter of the Year

Muay Thai
Professional
World Muaythai Council
2012 WMC Scandinavian Professional Muay Thai Championship (-63,5 kg)
Amateur
IFMA
2007 IFMA World Championship  (-63,5 kg) 
2008 IFMA World Championship  (-63,5 kg) 
2010 IFMA World Championship  (-63,5 kg)
2011 IFMA World Championship  (-63,5 kg)  
2012 IFMA-EMF European Championship  (-63,5 kg)  
2012 IFMA World Championship  (-63,5 kg)
2013 IFMA-EMF European Championship  (-63,5 kg)
Regional championships
2006 Swedish National Muay Thai Chamopionship  (-63,5 kg)
2007 Swedish National Muay Thai Championship  (-63,5 kg)
2007 Nordic Muay Thai Championship  (-63,5 kg)
2007 Thailand, Bangla Boxing Stadium Championship  (-63,5 kg)
2010 Nordic Muay Thai Championship  (-63,5 kg)
2011 Nordic Muay Thai Championship  (-63,5 kg)
2012 Antalya Turkey Championship  (-63,5 kg)
2012 Swedish National Muay Thai Championship  (-63,5 kg)
2013 Swedish National Muay Thai Championship  (-63,5 kg)

Shootfighting
Swedish Shootfighting League
2010 National Women's Featherweight Shootfighting Championship

Mixed martial arts record

|-
|Loss
|align=center|10–8
|Mayra Bueno Silva
|Submission (kneebar)
|UFC Fight Night: Andrade vs. Blanchfield
|
|align=center|2
|align=center|4:46
|Las Vegas, Nevada, United States
|
|-
|Loss
|align=center|10–7
|Karol Rosa
|Decision (majority)
|UFC 280
|
|align=center|3
|align=center|5:00
|Abu Dhabi, United Arab Emirates
|
|-
|Loss
|align=center|10–6
|Pannie Kianzad
|Decision (unanimous)
|UFC on ESPN: Luque vs. Muhammad 2 
|
|align=center|3
|align=center|5:00
|Las Vegas, Nevada, United States
|
|-
|Loss
|align=center|10–5
|Sara McMann
|Decision (unanimous)
|UFC Fight Night: Blaydes vs. dos Santos 
|
|align=center|3
|align=center|5:00
|Raleigh, North Carolina, United States
|
|-
|Win
|align=center|10–4
|Macy Chiasson
|Decision (unanimous)
|UFC Fight Night: Hermansson vs. Cannonier 
|
|align=center|3
|align=center|5:00
|Copenhagen, Denmark
|
|-
|Win
|align=center|9–4
|Tonya Evinger
|Decision (unanimous)
|UFC Fight Night: Gustafsson vs. Smith 
|
|align=center|3
|align=center|5:00
|Stockholm, Sweden
|
|-
|Loss
|align=center|8–4
|Yana Kunitskaya
| Decision (unanimous)
|UFC 229 
|
|align=center|3
|align=center|5:00
|Las Vegas, Nevada, United States
|
|- 
|Win
|align=center|8–3
|Gina Mazany
|Decision (unanimous)
|UFC Fight Night: Thompson vs. Till
|
|align=center|3
|align=center|5:00
|Liverpool, England
|
|- 
|Loss
|align=center|7–3
|Aspen Ladd
|TKO (punches)
|UFC Fight Night: Cowboy vs. Till
|
|align=center|2
|align=center|2:33
|Gdańsk, Poland
|
|-
|Win
|align=center|7–2
|Lucie Pudilová
|Decision (unanimous)
|UFC Fight Night: Manuwa vs. Anderson
|
|style="text-align:center;"|3
|style="text-align:center;"|5:00
|London, England
|
|-
| Loss
| align=center| 6–2
| Cris Cyborg
| TKO (punches)
| UFC Fight Night: Cyborg vs. Länsberg
| 
| style="text-align:center;" | 2
| style="text-align:center;" | 2:29
| Brasilia, Brazil
| 
|-
| Win
| align=center| 6–1
| Maria Hougaard Djursaa
| TKO (punches)
| Odense Fight Night 5
| 
| style="text-align:center;" | 2
| style="text-align:center;" | 2:00
| Odense, Denmark
| 
|-
| Win
| align=center| 5–1
| Lucie Pudilová
| Decision (unanimous)
| Battle of Botnia 2015
| 
| style="text-align:center;" | 3
| style="text-align:center;" | 5:00
| Umeå, Sweden
|
|-
| Win
| align=center| 4–1
| Alexandra Buch
| TKO (punches and elbows)
| Superior Challenge 12
| 
| style="text-align:center;" | 1
| style="text-align:center;" | 2:33
| Malmö, Sweden
| 
|-
| Win
| align=center| 3–1
| Laura Howarth
| TKO (retirement)
| Cage Warriors FC 71
| 
| style="text-align:center;" | 1
| style="text-align:center;" | 5:00
| Amman, Jordan
|
|-
| Win
| align=center| 2–1
| Emma Delaney
| TKO (punches and elbows)
| Cage Warriors FC 66
| 
| style="text-align:center;" | 3
| style="text-align:center;" | 2:26
| Ballerup, Denmark
| 
|-
| Win
| align=center| 1–1
| L.J. Adams
| Decision (unanimous)
| Heroes FC
| 
| style="text-align:center;" | 3
| style="text-align:center;" | 5:00
| Halmstad, Sweden
| 
|-
| Loss
| align=center| 0–1
| Pannie Kianzad
| TKO (punches)
| Trophy MMA 1
| 
| style="text-align:center;" | 3
| style="text-align:center;" | 4:44
| Malmö, Sweden
|
|}

See also 

 List of female mixed martial artists

References

External links
 
 

1982 births
Swedish female mixed martial artists
Living people
Female Muay Thai practitioners
Bantamweight mixed martial artists
Swedish Muay Thai practitioners
Swedish female kickboxers
Sportspeople from Karlstad
Featherweight mixed martial artists
Mixed martial artists utilizing Muay Thai
Mixed martial artists utilizing shootfighting
Ultimate Fighting Championship female fighters